St George Girls' High School (SGGHS) is a government-funded  single-sex academically selective secondary day school for girls, located in Kogarah, in the southern suburbs of Sydney, New South Wales, Australia.

Established in 1916 and operated by the New South Wales Department of Education, the school currently caters for approximately 920 students from Year 7 to Year 12. For first year entry, students must sit the Selective High Schools Test and are offered admission into the school based on academic merit.

History 

In June 1913 it was decided that Kogarah would be a suitable site for a new high school. On 31 October 1914, the land occupied by the cottage ‘Harrow Villa’ was purchased from its owner. This cottage with portable buildings added became the temporary St George Girls High School. St George Girls High School officially opened in February 1916 with 143 students and nine teachers.

Annual events 

Important annual events on the St George calendar include:
 Swimming and Athletics Carnivals
 The Walkathon
 SRC Week
 Drama Night, showcasing the talents of Drama students
 Senior Drama Night, showcasing talents of Year 12 Drama
 'Inspired' Night, a textiles and design fashion parade
 The Summer Music Festival in conjunction with the Multicultural Food Festival
 Gala Music Festival
 SRC School Dance (with Sydney Technical High School)
 The "Listen" concerts, which include the Stage Band, Orchestra and Concert Band
 The "Sing" concerts, which comprise the Vocal Ensemble and the Singing Tutorial girls

Organisations 
The School has four school organisations which provide support to the school:
 P & C Association - St George Girls High School Parents & Citizen' Association takes an active interest in the welfare and education of students. When possible, they have a guest speaker.
 St Georgians - The St Georgians is the association for ex-students of the school to meet regularly.
 Prefects - At St George Girls High School, there are 15 School Prefects, of them are two Vice Captains and one School Captain. These students are nominated and voted by their fellow Year 12 peers and lead in the planning events for their cohort and the wider school community.
 Student Representative Council (SRC) - St George Girls High School has an active Student Representative Council (SRC). Students from each year elect representatives from their class to represent them at SRC meetings. The SRC consists of four Year 11 students selected by the students of the school. In the past, the SRC has participated in charities such as Daffodil Day, Jeans for Genes day and Pink Ribbon day as well as fundraising activities such as the Walkathon, Gelato Days and Mufti Days. Money raised from school fundraising activities is used for improvements within the school. Recent SRC projects include planting of trees for shade, purchasing teaching resources in the school and providing additional seating arrangements around the school quadrangles.

Associated schools
Although St George Girls High School is an all-girls school, Sydney Technical High School is often referred to as their male counterpart. Being the 'Brother School' of St George Girls High School, Sydney Technical High School often engages in joint SRC fundraising activities. Examples of these include SRC school dances, the St George vs. Sydney Tech netball game during SRC week, as well as P&C meetings. Each schools' ISCF Group (called Lighthouse from St George and SALT from Sydney Tech) regularly join to become Lightly Salted.

Notable alumnae

Notable alumnae are referred to as Old Girls.

Entertainment, media and the arts 
 Van Badham - columnist for The Guardian, commentator, playwright and author
 Susien Chong - Fashion designer (Lover label)
 Eleanor Hall - ABC journalist
 Brenna Harding - Logie Award winning Actress. Has been in several TV shows, including Puberty Blues, My Place, and Packed to the Rafters
 Linda Marigliano - Radio host on national radio station Triple J, presenting the Good Nights program.
 Elizabeth Minchin - Professor of classics at the Australian National University
 Christina Stead - Australian novelist. Stead's novel, The Man Who Loved Children was heralded as a forgotten 20th-century "masterpiece" by American author Jonathan Franzen in The New York Times, who compared her to James Joyce and William Faulkner.
 Fiona Wright - award-winning essayist and poet

Medicine and sciences 
 Patricia Brennan  - was a medical missionary, wife and mother, television broadcaster, forensic physician, haematology registrar at Prince of Wales Hospital, physician and surgeon at the Sudan Interior Mission Hospital in Jos, Nigeria, and Galmi surgical and obstetric hospital in Niger. 
 Julie Campbell - a cell biologist and is recognised as a world leader in the field of smooth muscle biology.
 Lady Rita Cornforth - a chemist and the wife of Nobel Prize recipient Sir John Warcup Cornforth. They collaborated on a total of 41 papers that focused on enzyme stereochemistry. 
 Mary Gwenyth (Gwen) Fleming - one of the first women Doctors to pass through the University of Sydney, graduating with a Bachelor of Medicine and Bachelor of Surgery in 1939. Fleming was the first female Major in the Royal Australian Army Medical Corps and her specialty was thoracic medicine.  In 1945 Gwen was one of the first women admitted as a member of the Royal Australasian College of Physicians and in 1973, she was made a Fellow.
 Jean Sinclair (Clair) Isbister  - a pioneer in the development of hospital and outpatient services for mothers and babies, particularly in the area of childbirth practices and post-natal care. Her epidemiological studies at the Royal North Shore Hospital and Tresillian led to the establishment of numerous programs for mothers, babies and the care of children.

Sports 
 Michelle Ford - Olympic gold medallist (freestyle swimming) in the Moscow 1980 games

See also 

 List of Government schools in New South Wales
 List of selective high schools in New South Wales

References

External links

 St George Girls High School website
 Top 50 Secondary Schools in NSW

Educational institutions established in 1916
Public high schools in Sydney
Girls' schools in New South Wales
School buildings completed in 1916
1916 establishments in Australia
Girls High School
Selective schools in New South Wales
Kogarah, New South Wales